Jon Rollason (9 April 1931 – 20 February 2016) was an English television actor. He is best remembered for the role of Dr. Martin King in The Avengers. He also appeared in episodes of Doctor Who (as Harold Chorley in The Web of Fear), Z-Cars, Coronation Street, Crossroads in 1973 and Softly, Softly. He also wrote the scripts for episodes of the soap opera Crossroads.

References

External links

1931 births
2016 deaths
English male television actors
People from Birmingham, West Midlands